Ta Taok is a khum (commune) of Samlout District in Battambang Province in north-western Cambodia.

Villages

 Ou Nonoung
 Ou Kroach
 Ou Traeng
 Peam Ta
 Peam
 Ou Ta Teak
 Ta Tok
 Veal Rolueum
 Phnum Rai

References

Communes of Battambang province
Samlout District